Soběslav or Soběbor (c. 950 – 1004) was the brother of Saint Adalbert of Prague (Vojtěch), son of Střezislava and Slavník and a friend of Polish king, Boleslaus the Brave. He was equally powerful as the Přemyslid dynasty in his time, to whom he took a rather confrontational attitude. Even minting his own coinage, which had previously been the privilege of the Přemyslid court in Prague. Presumably the minting of coins began to take place after the episcopal election of Vojtěch. Likely in 995 fighting occurred between Slavník  dynasty and Přemyslid dynasty soldiers. This prompted Soběslav to take his grudge against the Přemyslids to the Emperor. While he was in Germany, on the 27th or the 28th of September, Přemyslid soldiers attacked the Slavník stronghold of Libice nad Cidlinou killing all members of the Slavník dynasty present. Soběslav then took part in a Imperial expedition against pagan Slavs, and then went to Boleslaus the Brave to obtain sanctuary in Poland. In 1004, Soběslav led the Charváts tribe and died on a bridge over the Vltava river in Prague in a battle between a Polish force retreating after besieging Prague Castle, and a Imperial-cum-Bohemian expeditionary force.

Notes

950 births
Year of birth uncertain
1004 deaths
10th-century rulers in Europe
10th-century Bohemian people
11th-century rulers in Europe
11th-century Bohemian people
Slavník dynasty